The Nyborg Tunnel is a proposed  long road tunnel between Åsane and Klauvaneset in the city-municipality of Bergen in Vestland county, Norway. If built, it would extend the four-lane motorway section of European route E39 (E39) from Åsane northwards to the Nordhordland Bridge. The tunnel is presumed financed with a five-year toll collection at the bridge while the tunnel is being built, and then with a toll on the tunnel for 15 years. It is estimated to cost . Construction is planned to start in 2014 .  The tunnel would branch off the current E39 highway at Åsane, just west of the IKEA store, and it would head northwards.  It would exit the tunnel just south of the Nordhordland Bridge.

References

Road tunnels in Bergen
Proposed tunnels in Norway
European route E39 in Norway
Proposed road tunnels in Europe
Proposed toll tunnels